Ronald McDonald House Charities (RMHC) is an independent American nonprofit organization whose stated mission is to create, find, and support programs that directly improve the health and well-being of children.

RMHC has a global network of chapters in 62 countries and regions under three core programs: Ronald McDonald House, Ronald McDonald Family Room and Ronald McDonald Care Mobile.

Programs
The first Ronald McDonald House was opened in Philadelphia in 1974. Jim Murray, general manager of the Philadelphia Eagles, was raising funds for one of his players' daughters when he met Children's Hospital of Philadelphia oncologist Audrey Evans.  They partnered with Elkman Advertising which handled marketing for McDonald's, and the charity took the name of the latter's mascot.

There are 368 Ronald McDonald Houses in 64 countries. These accommodate families with hospitalized children under 21 years of age (or 18 or 26, depending on the House), who are being treated at nearby hospitals and medical facilities. Ronald McDonald Houses provide over 7,200 bedrooms to families around the world each night, with an estimated value of $700 million in lieu of hotel costs.

There are currently 214 Ronald McDonald Family Rooms in 24 countries. These rooms accommodate over 3,000 families each day who live in the community and do not need or do not meet the prescribed criteria to stay at a Ronald McDonald House.

There are currently 50 Ronald McDonald Care Mobiles in nine countries. These mobile clinics offer health care for children in their own neighborhoods at no cost to the families. The program serves more than 100,000 children a year, and saves families in the US $10 million in medical and dental costs each year.

International
In 1981, the first Ronald McDonald House outside the United States opened, in Toronto, Ontario. In 1991, the 150th Ronald McDonald House opened, in Paris, France, although it has closed.  On July 25, 2005, the 250th location opened in Caracas, Venezuela, but it has since been closed.  The first in-hospital Ronald McDonald House in APMEA (Asia Pacific Middle East and Africa) opened at Queen Sirikit National Institute of Child Health, Bangkok, Thailand, on June 7, 2011.

Australia 
The first Ronald McDonald House in Australia was opened in Camperdown, New South Wales, in 1981. The number of Houses has since grown to 18. The program has since helped 100,000 families and houses up to 260 families per night. Each House is attached to a major children's or women's hospital. Each House has an independent board that manages its own day-to-day funding.

The Ronald McDonald's Learning Program (Australia only) was formed in 1997 to help children who had suffered minor illness and returned to school. Its stated mission is to provide "educational support" to these children who have fallen behind in their education. It is the only program of its kind in Australia. The program now works with over 1,000 students each week. It was first piloted in 1997 by Tracey Webster.

The Ronald McDonald's Learning Program supplies students with a cognitive and educational assessment by an educational psychologist, 40 hours of individual tutoring by a qualified teacher and 10 sessions of speech or occupational therapy, if required.

Other RMHC Australia activities include Family Rooms in 14 hospitals. They are located at Canberra Hospital, Garran, ACT; Gosford Hospital, Gosford, New South Wales; John Hunter Hospital, New Lambton Heights, New South Wales; Royal North Shore Hospital, St Leonards, New South Wales; Sydney Children's Hospital, Randwick, New South Wales; Nepean Hospital, Kingswood, New South Wales; Gold Coast Hospital Children's Ward, Southport, Queensland; Gold Coast Hospital NICU, Southport, Queensland; Monash Medical Centre, Clayton, Victoria; Sunshine Hospital, St Albans, Victoria; The Northern Hospital, Epping, Victoria; Wodonga Hospital, Wodonga, Victoria; Peel Health Campus, Mandurah, Western Australia; and Perth Children's Hospital, Nedlands, Western Australia.

RMHC Australia also operates Family Retreats that enable families of sick children to take a holiday for a week. The retreats are located in Ocean Grove, Victoria; Jurien Bay and Bunbury, Western Australia; Forster, New South Wales; and Palm Cove in Northern Queensland.

The Ronald McDonald Learning Program assists seriously ill children to catch up with missed education while staying in hospital. It provides assessment, therapy, and tuition to children and training for teachers. It assists over 500 children a week.

The Charlie Bell Scholarship Program is named after the first Australian Global McDonald's Corporation CEO. The program provides financial assistance in the form of 11 one-off scholarships a year. It assists with expenses related to vocational or tertiary education for children who have been seriously ill.

The Ronald McDonald Care Mobile is a partnership between RMHC Australia and Royal Far West. It is based in Orange in regional New South Wales and travels throughout rural and remote New South Wales.

Ronald McDonald House Charity Australia is also the major private donor to cord blood banks in Australia, providing a 10-year $A1 million commitment.

Hong Kong 
The first Ronald McDonald House in Hong Kong was opened in 1996 in Sha Tin.

The second House plans to establish in Kwun Tong District which is close proximity to the Hong Kong Children's Hospital.

Norway 
On May 21, 2016, Ronald McDonald Barnefond (Ronald McDonald Children's Fund), along with Stine Sofies Stiftelse, opened the world's first camp and learning center for children.  Stine Sofie Stiftelse first joined forces with Ronald McDonald Barnefond in 2015. The initial purpose was to fix houses where children of abuse and their families could stay for a day free of charge.

Pop Tab Program
Through the RMHC Pop Tab Collection Program, to date more than $4 million has been generated. The program was established to allow individuals and businesses to collect soda pop tabs from aluminum cans and donate them to their local RMHC chapter or Ronald McDonald's House. Though each program differs, for the most part, RMHC chapters use the money received from recycling the tabs to help offset operational expenses or to sponsor or support programs. Not all Houses participate in the Pop Tab Program. Collected pop tabs are used by Ronald McDonald House Charities to fund their work.

The Alpha Delta Pi sorority partners with Ronald McDonald House Charities to promote and participate in the Pop Tab Program.

Awards
Worth magazine named Ronald McDonald's House Charity one of "America's 100 Best Charities" in 2001 and 2002.

The U.S. Green Building Council awarded the Ronald McDonald's House Charities of Austin and Central Texas (RMHC-ACT) with Leadership in Energy and Environmental Design (LEED) Platinum certification, the highest level of sustainable building in the nation.

Criticism
Ronald McDonald House has been criticised as an attempt by McDonald's to distract from its role in contributing to childhood obesity and animal welfare issues. Anne Markwardt of Foodwatch, which researches food industry practices, said that "One has to remember that a large amount of the funding does not come from McDonald's itself but from private, corporate or other donors;" in 2013 it was estimated by Corporate Accountability International that McDonald's only contributed about 20% of the funding; about 30% came from McDonald's customers' donations. Markwardt said that the houses are "used as marketing ploys for profitable but unhealthy products, as well as means of indirect political influence," noting that politicians regularly visited for photo opportunities.

See also
 Fisher House Foundation, a similar charity for military families
 Fred Hill
 McHappy Day
 Jim Murray
 Patient hotel
 Ronald McDonald House New York
 Ronald McDonald House Charities Canada

References

External links

 Ronald McDonald House official website
 Ronald McDonald House Charities Thailand official website

McDonald's charities
Health charities in the United States
Charities based in Illinois
Organizations for children with health issues
Organizations established in 1974
Medical and health organizations based in Illinois
Medical and health organizations based in the United States